Emessa (Homs) is an album of original music for piano and orchestra composed and orchestrated by Malek Jandali and recorded with The Russian Philharmonic Orchestra with Seregey Kondrashev as a conductor. The music was inspired by and dedicated to the people of Syria in their struggle for freedom and human rights. The release of “Freedom Qashoush Symphony”  was accompanied by a tour of the United States, Europe and the Middle East.

Track listing

Personnel

 Malek Jandali – composer, producer, publisher; piano, orchestration and arrangement
 Sergey Kondrashev – conductor
 the Russian Philharmonic Orchestra
 Roger Seibel – mastering engineer and sound master

References

External links
 The official website of Malek Jandali

2011 albums
World music albums by Syrian artists